Mixcoac is a station on Line 7 and Line 12 of the Mexico City Metro. The station serves both lines as a transfer station and as the northwestern terminus of Line 12. In 2019, the station had an average total ridership of 54,963 passengers per day.

History
The station opened on 19 December 1985 as part of the third stage of Line 7.

In 2012, with the inauguration of Line 12, Mixcoac became a transfer station, as well as the temporary terminus of the mentioned line.

An extension of Line 12 from Mixcoac to Observatorio is under construction, projected to be finished by 2020. By that time, Mixcoac will no longer work as the western terminus of Line 12.

General information
The station runs deep under Avenida Revolución, a main thoroughfare in Mexico City. It serves the Mixcoac area of the city.
There are two main entrances to the station: one in the west sidewalk of the aforementioned avenue and the other in a small plaza between Avenida Revolución, Avenida Patriotismo, Eje 7 Sur Extremadura and Calle Empresa.

Metro Mixcoac serves the following neighborhoods: Santa María Nonoalco, Mixcoac, San Juan and Insurgentes Mixcoac.

Name and pictogram
The station is named after the neighborhood of Mixcoac, where it is located. The station pictogram depicts a snake because the Nahuatl name Mixcoac means "Nest of Cloud Serpents".

Ridership

Metro Museum
Mixcoac station houses the Museo del Metro (Metro Museum), a museum dedicated to the history and culture of the Mexico City Metro.

The museum has seven rooms, each one with specific items including: whiteprints, floor plans and technical drawings from the construction of the metro, a collection of photos, metro tickets from different periods and archeological objects that have been found during the excavations to build the twelve metro lines.

Exits

Line 7
East: Av. Revolución between Extremadura street and Empresa street, Mixcoac
West: Av. Revolución between Andrea del Sarto street and Benvenuto Cellini street, Col. Santa María Nonoalco

Line 12
Southeast: Av. Patriotismo and Donatelo street, Col. Insurgentes Mixcoac
Northeast: Empresa street and Av. Revolución, Col. San Juan

Gallery

References

External links 
 
 

Mixcoac
Railway stations opened in 1985
1985 establishments in Mexico
2012 establishments in Mexico
Railway stations opened in 2012
Mexico City Metro Line 12 stations
Accessible Mexico City Metro stations
Mexico City Metro stations in Benito Juárez, Mexico City